Kedron Taylor is an Australian country musician. His album Every Place I Go was nominated for a 1999 ARIA Award for Best Country Album and he has been nominated for five golden guitars.

Discography

Albums

Awards and nominations

ARIA Music Awards
The ARIA Music Awards are a set of annual ceremonies presented by Australian Recording Industry Association (ARIA), which recognise excellence, innovation, and achievement across all genres of the music of Australia. They commenced in 1987. 

! 
|-
| 1999 || Every Place I Go || ARIA Award for Best Country Album ||  ||

References

External links
Kedron Taylor's Classic Australian Life.

Australian male singers
Living people
1963 births